is a former Japanese football player, and currently is managing Tokyo Verdy, who plays in the J2 League. His brother Naoto Hori is also a footballer.

Playing career
Hori was born in Atsugi on September 10, 1967. After graduating from Meiji University, he joined Toshiba in 1990. He became a regular player as offensive midfielder from first season. He moved to Urawa Reds in 1992. Although he played many matches as defensive midfielder, he was converted to defensive midfielder by new manager Holger Osieck in 1995. He lost opportunity to play in 1998 and he moved to Bellmare Hiratsuka (later Shonan Bellmare) in 1999. He played many matches and supported the club with many young players due to financial strain end of 1998 season. He retired end of 2001 season.

Coaching career
After retirement, Hori started a coaching career at Shonan Bellmare in 2002. He moved to Urawa Reds in 2005. He mainly managed youth team. Top team performance was bad in 2011, and manager Željko Petrović was sacked and Hori named a new manager in October. He managed 5 matches and remained the club stayed J1 League. From 2012, he became a coach under new manager Mihailo Petrović. In July 2017, Petrović was sacked and Hori became a manager again. The club won the champions 2017 AFC Champions League for the first time in 10 years. He was also selected AFC Coach of the Year in 2017. However the club performance was bad in 2018 season, he was sacked in April.

Club statistics

Managerial statistics

Honours

Manager
Urawa Red Diamonds
 AFC Champions League: 2017

Individual
 AFC Coach of the Year: 2017

References

External links
 
 
 

1967 births
Living people
Meiji University alumni
People from Atsugi, Kanagawa
Association football people from Kanagawa Prefecture
Japanese footballers
Japan Soccer League players
J1 League players
J2 League players
Hokkaido Consadole Sapporo players
Urawa Red Diamonds players
Shonan Bellmare players
Japanese football managers
J1 League managers
J2 League managers
Urawa Red Diamonds managers
Tokyo Verdy managers
Association football midfielders